Patrice Bailly-Salins (born 21 June 1964) is a former French biathlete. He won at the 1994 Olympics in Lillehammer a bronze medal with the French relay team. In 1995, he won the world title in the sprint event and came second in the 4 × 7.5 km relay with the French relay team.
In 1994, he won the overall World Cup

Biathlon results
All results are sourced from the International Biathlon Union.

Olympic Games
1 medal (1 bronze)

World Championships
2 medals (1 gold, 1 silver)

*During Olympic seasons competitions are only held for those events not included in the Olympic program.
**Pursuit was added as an event in 1997.

Individual victories
7 victories (4 In, 3 Sp)

*Results are from UIPMB and IBU races which include the Biathlon World Cup, Biathlon World Championships and the Winter Olympic Games.

References

External links
 

1964 births
Living people
French male biathletes
Biathletes at the 1992 Winter Olympics
Biathletes at the 1994 Winter Olympics
Biathletes at the 1998 Winter Olympics
Olympic biathletes of France
Medalists at the 1994 Winter Olympics
Olympic medalists in biathlon
Olympic bronze medalists for France
Biathlon World Championships medalists